Kazan State University of Culture and Arts (KazSUCA) is located in Kazan, Tatarstan, Russia.

Personnel
The founder of Kazan State University of Culture and Arts is the Ministry of Culture of the Russian Federation. The rector of the university is Rivkat Youssoupov.

KazSUCA is represented by more than 300 teachers, including 32 professors, 107 senior lecturers, 148 Doctors of Science. About 70 professors and lecturers of the university have honorary titles of Tatarstan Republic and the Russian Federation, among them there are winners of the state awards of the Russian Federation and Tatarstan Republic.

Kazan State University of Culture and Arts has about 3000 students (who study in a full-time and correspondence faculties), 9 Faculties, 30 Departments. KazSUKA fulfills 25 licensed programs of bachelors, 3 programs of masters, 5 programs of experts.

International activity

The international activity is one of the priority directions of the development and modernization of the university and is considered as one of the strategic ways of expansion of its educational space, development of the university science, social and cultural interactions with the international educational institutions and the organizations. To achieve the set purposes, the university develops communication, direct contacts with foreign high schools and universities.

Cooperation with other institutions

Nowadays there are agreements about the development of the university's cooperation in the field of education, science and culture with the International center of high technologies in the field of recreational technology and leisure development (Netherlands), Lycée of ZH.-B.Coreau (France), Lugansk state institute of culture and arts (Ukraine), Komratsk state university (Moldova), Tashkent state institute of culture of A. Kadyri (Uzbekistan), The Baltic International academy (Riga, Latvia), Children's and youth's international society «EVENTUS» (Riga, Latvia), Kirghiz state institute of arts of B.Beyshenalieva, Kazakh national academy of arts of Zhurgenev, Fulbright foundation (USA), Public charitable organization of Tatarstan Republic «The tolerance Center «The world of Volga region», working in Tatarstan Republic within the Russian-American program «A trust climate » and MOU with The State university of the New York State (SUNY, the USA),

UNESCO

According to the agreement with UNESCO’s special department of human rights and democracy of Moscow State University of International Relations of the Foreign Affairs Ministry of the Russian Federation in April, 2011 there was founded a branch of this department in the university.

References
Information about the university: http://116.ru/firms/details/88016.html
Interview with the rector Rivkat Youssoupov: http://116.ru/text/generation/446647.html
В КГУКИ не до скуки// Молодежь Татарстана: https://archive.today/20130417062138/http://moltat.ru/menu/obrazovanie/v-kguki-ne-do-skuki
В КГУКИ зажгли "Огни Казани": https://archive.today/20130417043320/http://moltat.ru/menu/news/v-kguki-zazhgli-ogni-kazani

Universities in Kazan
Cultural heritage monuments in Tatarstan